Route 580 is a  long north–south secondary highway in the eastern portion of Carleton County, New Brunswick, Canada.

The route starts at Route 107 in Glassville. The road travels south through a mostly forested area through Esdraelon and Windsor before ending at Route 104 in Lower Windsor.

History

See also

References

580
580